Ann Walton Kroenke (born December 20, 1948) is an heiress to the Walmart fortune. Ann and her sister, Nancy Walton Laurie, inherited stock from her father, Bud Walton (died 1995), who was the brother and an early business partner of Walmart founder Sam Walton. She is the owner of the Denver Nuggets of the NBA and Colorado Avalanche of the NHL.

Her husband, Stan Kroenke, is the majority owner and CEO of the Los Angeles Rams (NFL), Arsenal (Premier League), Colorado Rapids (Major League Soccer), and Colorado Mammoth (National Lacrosse League).

Forbes estimated her net worth to be around US$9.1 billion in January 2022.

See also
List of billionaires
List of female billionaires

References

Living people
American billionaires
Female billionaires
American businesspeople in retailing
Kroecke, Ann Walton
Businesspeople from Columbia, Missouri
1948 births
National Basketball Association executives
National Basketball Association owners
National Hockey League executives
National Hockey League owners
Colorado Avalanche owners
Denver Nuggets owners
Kroenke Sports & Entertainment
Columbia College (Missouri) alumni